Cameron Cullen (born 9 September 1993) is an Australian professional rugby league footballer who plays for the Redcliffe Dolphins in the Intrust Super Cup. He previously played for the Gold Coast Titans.

Background
Born in Brisbane, Queensland, Cullen grew up in Cabarita, attending Palm Beach Currumbin High School on the Gold Coast and playing his junior rugby league for the Tweed Coast Raiders, before being signed by the Brisbane Broncos as a teenager.

Playing career

Early career
In 2009, Cullen played for the Gold Coast Vikings Cyril Connell Cup team and represented the Queensland under-16 team. In 2010, Cullen represented the Australian Schoolboys on their tour of Wales, England and France. In 2011, Cullen played for Wynnum Manly's Mal Meninga Cup team and represented the Queensland under-18 team. Later that season he made his NYC debut for the Brisbane Broncos, playing for them until 2013. In 2014, Cullen joined the Broncos' NRL squad but spent the season playing for their Queensland Cup affiliate club, the Redcliffe Dolphins. In 2015, Cullen joined the Mackay Cutters and spent the pre-season trialling with the North Queensland Cowboys. Later that season, Cullen was named 18th man for the Queensland Residents.

2016
In 2016, Cullen joined the Burleigh Bears and spent the pre-season trialling with the Gold Coast Titans. On 1 March, he earned a one-year contract with the Titans.

In round 6 of the 2016 NRL season, he made his NRL debut for the Gold Coast against the Cronulla-Sutherland Sharks.

Cullen made five appearances for Manly-Warringah in the 2017 NRL season as the club reached the finals but were eliminated in the first week by Penrith.

2019
Cullen joined Qcup cup Redcliffe.

2022
after 2 years with Burleigh in 2016/17
And Redcliffe from 2018/2022
Cullen retired.

Personal life
Cullen's father, Wayne, started at halfback for the Souths Magpies in their 1985 BRL premiership win.

References

External links
Manly Sea Eagles profile
Gold Coast Titans profile

1993 births
Living people
Australian rugby league players
Burleigh Bears players
Gold Coast Titans players
Mackay Cutters players
Manly Warringah Sea Eagles players
Redcliffe Dolphins players
Rugby league five-eighths
Rugby league players from Brisbane